Santo Stefano is a frazione of Sante Marie, in the Province of L'Aquila in the Abruzzo,  region of Italy.

Frazioni of Sante Marie